Desert Valley is a 1926 American silent Western film directed by Scott R. Dunlap and written by Randall Faye based upon a novel by Jackson Gregory. The film stars Buck Jones, Virginia Brown Faire, Malcolm Waite, Jack W. Johnston, Charles Brinley, and Eugene Pallette. The film was released on December 26, 1926, by Fox Film Corporation.

Cast
 Buck Jones as Fitzsmith
 Virginia Brown Faire as Mildred Dean
 Malcolm Waite as Jeff Hoades
 Jack W. Johnston as Tim Dean 
 Charles Brinley as Sheriff
 Eugene Pallette as Deputy

Preservation
A print of Desert Valley is preserved in the BFI National Archive in London.

References

External links
 
 

1926 films
1926 Western (genre) films
Fox Film films
American black-and-white films
Films directed by Scott R. Dunlap
Silent American Western (genre) films
1920s English-language films
1920s American films